William Wenman (22 May 1832 – 23 November 1921) was an English first-class cricketer active 1862–64 who played for Kent. The son of Ned Wenman, he was born in Benenden and died in Souris, Manitoba. He played in eleven first-class matches as a right-handed batsman, scoring 179 runs with a highest score of 29 and held 6 catches.

References

1832 births
1921 deaths
English cricketers
Kent cricketers
People from Benenden
People from Souris, Manitoba